Hewlett-Packard, commonly referred to as HP, was an electronics technology company that shed its roots in 1999 by spinning off the first businesses of Test & Measurement, Medical, Analytical, Semiconductor as Agilent Technologies.  It is now best known now as an information technology corporation, based in Palo Alto, California, which was split into two companies: Hewlett Packard Enterprise and HP Inc. The company was founded by Bill Hewlett and Dave Packard in a small garage on January 1, 1939. As of 2012, HP is the largest technology company in the world in terms of revenue, ranking 10th in the Fortune Global 500.
As of 2012, Hewlett-Packard has made a total of 129 acquisitions since 1986. Its first acquisition was the F.L. Moseley Company in 1958. This move enabled HP to enter the plotter business, which was the predecessor to its printer business of today. In 1989, HP purchased Apollo Computer for US$476 million, enabling HP to become the largest supplier of computer workstations. In 1995, the company bought another computer manufacturer, Convex Computer, for US$150 million. In 2000, HP spun off its measurement, chemical and medical businesses into an independent company named Agilent Technologies. The company's largest acquisition came in 2002, when it merged with Compaq, a personal computer manufacturer, for US$25 billion. The combined company overtook Dell for the largest share of the personal computer market worldwide in the second quarter.

Within IT networking hardware and storage market segments, HP has made acquisitions worth over US$15 billion, the largest one being 3PAR and 3COM acquisitions made in 2010, totaling over $5 billion. The most recent acquisition in the enterprise networking segment is Aruba Networks in March 2015 for US$3 billion. 
On the IT services and consulting side, the largest acquisition made so far is Electronic Data Systems, in 2008 for US$13.9 billion

In the software products market segment, a stream of acquisitions has helped strengthen HP's position . The largest software company purchased prior to 2011 was Mercury Interactive for US$4.5 billion. This acquisition doubled the size of HP's software business to more than US$2 billion in annual revenue.

Between 2012 and 2013, HP had no acquisitions in any of its business segments as the firm was recouping an $8.8 billion write-off suffered as a result of acquisition of British software company Autonomy Corporation for $11 billion in 2011. 
After this two-year gap, in 2014, HP returned to the acquisition market by acquiring Computer Networking Software company Shunra. The majority of companies acquired by HP are based in the United States.

At the end of 2014, HP announced that it will split into two companies, Hewlett Packard Enterprise and HP Inc. The former focuses on enterprise infrastructure and software solutions, whilst the latter focuses on consumer markets with PCs and printers. On November 1, 2015, they became separate companies.



Acquisitions
Each acquisition was for the respective company in its entirety, unless otherwise specified. The agreement date listed is the date of the agreement between HP and the subject of the acquisition, while the acquisition date listed is the exact date in which the acquisition completes. The value of each acquisition is usually the one listed at the time of the announcement. If the value of an acquisition is not listed, then it is undisclosed.

Notes
 This figure by The Alacra Store includes acquisitions by companies that are eventually acquired by HP. The actual number of acquisitions included in this list is 96.
 The acquisitions are ordered by acquisition dates. If the acquisition date is not available, then the acquisition is ordered by agreement dates.

Footnotes

References

Hewlett-Packard